The Pink Paper was a UK publication covering gay and lesbian issues published by Millivres Prowler Limited. Founded in 1987 as a newspaper, it switched to internet-only publication in June 2009.  The decision to go online-only was announced in June 2009 and attributed to economic conditions, and at the time management said a printed version might reappear in the future.

A decision to close the website – again citing poor economic conditions – was taken in June 2012, with the site finally being shuttered in September 2012. The brand and assets remain in the ownership of Millivres Prowler.

As a tabloid newspaper, it had a circulation in the tens of thousands across Britain. It was distributed free in bars, clubs, libraries, community centres, businesses and other places.

Pink Paper had regional correspondents around the country who filed stories from their area. They also covered national news stories. Comment, lifestyle, culture, celebrity interviews and gossip, travel, property and finance were also included in the Pink Paper.

Past staff members include Phil Reay-Smith, now of ITN; Ben Summerskill, former chief executive of Stonewall; SFX editor Darren Scott; author Peter Lloyd and Tim Teeman of The Times.

References

External links
 
 LGBT Archive, UK, Pink Paper wiki page
 Survived by:
 Gay Times
 Diva

LGBT-related newspapers published in the United Kingdom
LGBT-related mass media in the United Kingdom
Newspapers established in 1987
Publications disestablished in 2012
Defunct newspapers published in the United Kingdom
1987 establishments in the United Kingdom